Herbfields are plant communities dominated by herbaceous plants, especially forbs and grasses.  They are found where climatic conditions do not allow large woody plants to grow, such as in subantarctic and alpine tundra environments.  Herbfield is defined in New South Wales (Australia) government legislation as native vegetation that predominantly does not contain an over-storey or a mid-storey and where ground cover is dominated by non-grass species.  The New Zealand Department of Conservation has described herbfield vegetation as that in which the cover of herbs in the canopy is 20–100%, and in which herb cover is greater than that of any other growth form, or of bare ground.

Various kinds of herbfield include:
 Tall alpine herbfield
 Short alpine herbfield
 Tussock herbfield
 Wet herbfield
 Aquatic herbfield

References

Notes

Sources
 
 

Habitats
Ecosystems
 
Habitat